The 2006 WNBA season was the first for the Chicago Sky. On February 8, 2005, the David Stern announced that the WNBA would be expanding to Chicago beginning with the 2006 season. Chicago became the second team in league history to be owned and operated outside of the NBA entity. On September 20, 2005, the Chicago franchise announced their team name to be the Sky.

Dave Cowens was named the first head coach of the Sky. The year was much of a struggle for the Sky, as they went 5–29 in their first season. Rookie Candice Dupree was named to the All-Rookie Team following the season for her solid rookie season. Cowens left the team following the year.

Transactions

Expansion Draft
Chicago had the right to acquire one player from each of the 13 WNBA teams. Each team had designated a maximum of six players who would not be available for selection in the Expansion Draft.

WNBA Draft

Trades and Roster Changes

Roster
{| class="toccolours" style="font-size: 95%; width: 100%;"
|-
! colspan="2"  style="background:#4b90cc; color:#Fbb726"|2006 Chicago Sky Roster
|- style="text-align:center; background-color:#Fbb726; color:#FFFFFF;"
! Players !! Coaches
|- 
| valign="top" |
{| class="sortable" style="background:transparent; margin:0px; width:100%;"
! Pos. !! # !! Nat. !! Name !! Ht. !! Wt. !! From
|-

Depth

Schedule

Regular Season

|- style="background:#cfc;"
| 1
| May 20
| @ Charlotte
| 83-82
| Candice Dupree (19)
| Candice Dupree (6)
| Elaine Powell (3)
| Time Warner Cable Arena  6,010
| 1-0
|- style="background:#fcc;"
| 2
| May 23
| Sacramento
| 63-76
| Stacey Lovelace (11)
| Ashley Robinson (8)
| Elaine Powell (7)
| UIC Pavilion  5,112
| 1-1
|- style="background:#fcc;"
| 3
| May 26
| Indiana
| 60-75
| Jia Perkins (16)
| Ashley Robinson (7)
| PowellNewtonPerkins (3)
| UIC Pavilion  3,151
| 1-2
|- style="background:#fcc;"
| 4
| May 30
| Los Angeles
| 55-64
| Jia Perkins (12)
| Stacey Lovelace (11)
| Brooke Wyckoff (4)
| UIC Pavilion  3,086
| 1-3
|-

|- style="background:#fcc;"
| 5
| June 2
| @ Houston
| 60-71
| Amanda Lassiter (14)
| Deanna Jackson (7)
| PerkinsLassiterJackson (3)
| Toyota Center  5,397
| 1-4
|- style="background:#fcc;"
| 6
| June 4
| Detroit
| 66-81
| Amanda Lassiter (20)
| Candice Dupree (7)
| Candice Dupree (4)
| UIC Pavilion  3,135
| 1-5
|- style="background:#fcc;"
| 7
| June 7
| @ Seattle
| 73-86
| DupreeNgoyisa (16)
| Bernadette Ngoyisa (8)
| Amanda Lassiter (6)
| KeyArena  5,741
| 1-6
|- style="background:#fcc;"
| 8
| June 9
| @ Los Angeles
| 65-73
| Jia Perkins (19)
| Jia Perkins (9)
| Jia Perkins (4)
| Staples Center  7,282
| 1-7
|- style="background:#fcc;"
| 9
| June 10
| @ Sacramento
| 70-80
| PerkinsDupree (17)
| Bernadette Ngoyisa (10)
| Jia Perkins (7)
| ARCO Arena  10,416
| 1-8
|- style="background:#fcc;"
| 10
| June 15
| Seattle
| 61-74
| Stacey Lovelace (15)
| Candice Dupree (12)
| Jia Perkins (7)
| UIC Pavilion  2,956
| 1-9
|- style="background:#fcc;"
| 11
| June 17
| San Antonio
| 65-69
| Jia Perkins (21)
| Jia Perkins (10)
| Brooke Wyckoff (4)
| UIC Pavilion  2,806
| 1-10
|- style="background:#fcc;"
| 12
| June 21
| @ Indiana
| 55-77
| Stacey Lovelace (13)
| Deanna Jackson (8)
| Ashley Robinson (3)
| Bankers Life Fieldhouse  6,310
| 1-11
|- style="background:#fcc;"
| 13
| June 23
| Connecticut
| 79-84
| Jia Perkins (13)
| Candice Dupree (7)
| PerkinsWyckoff (4)
| UIC Pavilion  2,818
| 1-12
|- style="background:#fcc;"
| 14
| June 25
| @ Phoenix
| 77-90
| Candice Dupree (15)
| DupreePerkinsJackson (5)
| NewtonPowell (2)
| US Airways Center  6,124
| 1-13
|- style="background:#cfc;"
| 15
| June 29
| Charlotte
| 75-69
| Candice Dupree (15)
| Candice Dupree (7)
| Chelsea Newton (4)
| UIC Pavilion  2,570
| 2-13

|- style="background:#fcc;"
| 16
| July 1
| @ San Antonio
| 57-69
| Candice Dupree (16)
| Candice Dupree (9)
| DupreeNewton (4)
| AT&T Center  6,060
| 2-14
|- style="background:#cfc;"
| 17
| July 7
| New York
| 78-73
| Candice Dupree (20)
| Candice Dupree (6)
| DupreeNewton (3)
| UIC Pavilion  3,375
| 3-14
|- style="background:#fcc;"
| 18
| July 9
| @ Washington
| 83-89
| LassiterNgoyisa (17)
| Amanda Lassiter (7)
| Amanda Lassiter (5)
| Verizon Center  7,618
| 3-15
|- style="background:#fcc;"
| 19
| July 14
| Houston
| 77-82
| Bernadette Ngoyisa (16)
| DupreeLovelace (5)
| Jia Perkins (6)
| UIC Pavilion  3,626
| 3-16
|- style="background:#fcc;"
| 20
| July 16
| Washington
| 75-83
| Stacey Dales (15)
| Bernadette Ngoyisa (6)
| Jia Perkins (4)
| UIC Pavilion  2,983
| 3-17
|- style="background:#fcc;"
| 21
| July 19
| @ Minnesota
| 82-90
| Candice Dupree (14)
| Bernadette Ngoyisa (11)
| Jia Perkins (6)
| Target Center  14,793
| 3-18
|- style="background:#fcc;"
| 22
| July 20
| @ Connecticut
| 72-86
| Jia Perkins (21)
| Bernadette Ngoyisa (6)
| Jia Perkins (6)
| Mohegan Sun Arena  6,740
| 3-19
|- style="background:#fcc;"
| 23
| July 22
| @ Detroit
| 70-89
| PerkinsDales (12)
| Candice Dupree (7)
| DupreeNewtonDales (3)
| Palace of Auburn Hills  10,456
| 3-20
|- style="background:#fcc;"
| 24
| July 25
| New York
| 72-79
| Candice Dupree (22)
| Amanda Lassiter (8)
| Candice Dupree (5)
| UIC Pavilion  3,435
| 3-21
|- style="background:#fcc;"
| 25
| July 27
| @ Washington
| 74-92
| NgoyisaDales (18)
| Bernadette Ngoyisa (5)
| Jia Perkins (10)
| Verizon Center  9,290
| 3-22
|- style="background:#cfc;"
| 26
| July 28
| Minnesota
| 79-65
| Stacey Dales (20)
| NgoyisaPerkins (7)
| DalesNgoyisa (4)
| UIC Pavilion  2,967
| 4-22
|- style="background:#fcc;"
| 27
| July 30
| Indiana
| 64-69
| Candice Dupree (25)
| Bernadette Ngoyisa (6)
| PerkinsLassiter (6)
| UIC Pavilion  3,430
| 4-23

|- style="background:#fcc;"
| 28
| August 1
| Phoenix
| 70-90
| Stacey Lovelace (14)
| Bernadette Ngoyisa (9)
| Liz Moeggenberg (4)
| UIC Pavilion  5,219
| 4-24
|- style="background:#fcc;"
| 29
| August 4
| Detroit
| 49-76
| Stacey Lovelace (10)
| Bernadette Ngoyisa (8)
| Liz Moeggenberg (3)
| UIC Pavilion  3,455
| 4-25
|- style="background:#fcc;"
| 30
| August 5
| @ New York
| 69-80
| Candice Dupree (24)
| Candice Dupree (6)
| Chelsea Newton (5)
| Madison Square Garden  8,872
| 4-26
|- style="background:#fcc;"
| 31
| August 8
| Connecticut
| 59-85
| Bernadette Ngoyisa (11)
| Candice Dupree (10)
| BrownDales (4)
| UIC Pavilion  3,520
| 4-27
|- style="background:#fcc;"
| 32
| August 10
| @ Detroit
| 48-82
| Candice Dupree (12)
| Stacey Lovelace (7)
| Amanda Lassiter (3)
| Palace of Auburn Hills  11,226
| 4-28
|- style="background:#fcc;"
| 33
| August 12
| @ Charlotte
| 57-84
| Bernadette Ngoyisa (23)
| DupreeNgoyisa (10)
| Coretta Brown (4)
| Time Warner Cable Arena  8,339
| 4-29
|- style="background:#cfc;"
| 34
| August 13
| @ Indiana
| 80-73
| Candice Dupree (24)
| Chelsea Newton (9)
| Amanda Lassiter (5)
| Bankers Life Fieldhouse  8,381
| 5-29

Standings

Statistics

Regular Season

Awards and Honors

References

External links
Chicago Sky on Basketball Reference

Chicago Sky seasons
Chicago
Chicago Sky